Isaac Newton Harvey Beahm (May 14, 1859 – November 11, 1950) was the President of Elizabethtown College, in Elizabethtown, Pennsylvania, USA.

Though president from 1900 until 1901, he did not perform any duties because of illness. He returned as president in 1904 and served until 1909.

References

Presidents of Elizabethtown College
1950 deaths
1859 births